Donald William White (January 8, 1919 – June 15, 1987) was a Major League Baseball outfielder who played for two seasons. He played for the Philadelphia Athletics from 1948 to 1949, playing in 143 career games.

External links

1919 births
1987 deaths
Philadelphia Athletics players
Tacoma Tigers players
Lewiston Indians players
San Francisco Seals (baseball) players
San Diego Padres (minor league) players
Portland Beavers players
Major League Baseball outfielders
Baseball players from Washington (state)